Garfield Township is the name of some places in the U.S. state of Michigan:

 Garfield Township, Bay County, Michigan
 Garfield Township, Clare County, Michigan
 Garfield Township, Grand Traverse County, Michigan (Garfield Charter Township, Michigan)
 Garfield Township, Kalkaska County, Michigan
 Garfield Township, Mackinac County, Michigan
 Garfield Township, Newaygo County, Michigan

See also 
 Garfield, Michigan (disambiguation)
 Garfield Township (disambiguation)

Michigan township disambiguation pages